María Reyes (born 29 June 1964) is a Puerto Rican archer. She competed in the women's individual event at the 1996 Summer Olympics. Later she became a trainer of the national archery team of Puerto Rico.

References

External links
 

1964 births
Living people
Puerto Rican female archers
Olympic archers of Puerto Rico
Archers at the 1996 Summer Olympics
Place of birth missing (living people)
Pan American Games medalists in archery
Pan American Games bronze medalists for Puerto Rico
Archers at the 1995 Pan American Games
Medalists at the 1995 Pan American Games